Multiscale modeling  or multiscale mathematics is the field of solving problems that have important features at multiple scales of time and/or space. Important problems include multiscale modeling of fluids, solids, polymers, proteins, nucleic acids as well as various physical and chemical phenomena (like adsorption, chemical reactions, diffusion).

An example of such problems involve the Navier-Stokes equations for incompressible fluid flow.

In a wide variety of applications, the stress tensor  is given as a linear function of the gradient . Such a choice for  has been proven to be sufficient for describing the dynamics of a broad range of fluids. However, its use for more complex fluids such as polymers is dubious. In such a case, it may be necessary to use multiscale modeling to accurately model the system such that the stress tensor can be extracted without requiring the computational cost of a full microscale simulation.

History
Horstemeyer 2009, 2012 presented a historical review of the different disciplines (mathematics, physics, and materials science) for solid materials related to multiscale materials modeling.

The aforementioned DOE multiscale modeling efforts were hierarchical in nature. The first concurrent multiscale model occurred when Michael Ortiz (Caltech) took the molecular dynamics code, Dynamo, (developed by Mike Baskes at Sandia National Labs) and with his students embedded it into a finite element code for the first time. Martin Karplus, Michael Levitt, Arieh Warshel 2013 were awarded a Nobel Prize in Chemistry for the development of a multiscale model method using both classical and quantum mechanical theory which were used to model large complex chemical systems and reactions.

Areas of research
In physics and chemistry, multiscale modeling is aimed at the calculation of material properties or system behavior on one level using information or models from different levels. On each level, particular approaches are used for the description of a system. The following levels are usually distinguished: level of quantum mechanical models (information about electrons is included), level of molecular dynamics models (information about individual atoms is included), coarse-grained models (information about atoms and/or groups of atoms is included), mesoscale or nano-level (information about large groups of atoms and/or molecule positions is included), level of continuum models, level of device models. Each level addresses a phenomenon over a specific window of length and time. Multiscale modeling is particularly important in integrated computational materials engineering since it allows the prediction of material properties or system behavior based on knowledge of the process-structure-property relationships.

In operations research, multiscale modeling addresses challenges for decision-makers that come from multiscale phenomena across organizational, temporal, and spatial scales. This theory fuses decision theory and multiscale mathematics and is referred to as multiscale decision-making. Multiscale decision-making draws upon the analogies between physical systems and complex man-made systems.

In meteorology, multiscale modeling is the modeling of the interaction between weather systems of different spatial and temporal scales that produces the weather that we experience. The most challenging task is to model the way through which the weather systems interact as models cannot see beyond the limit of the model grid size. In other words, to run an atmospheric model that is having a grid size (very small ~ ) which can see each possible cloud structure for the whole globe is computationally very expensive. On the other hand, a computationally feasible Global climate model (GCM), with grid size ~ , cannot see the smaller cloud systems. So we need to come to a balance point so that the model becomes computationally feasible and at the same time we do not lose much information, with the help of making some rational guesses, a process called parametrization.

Besides the many specific applications, one area of research is methods for the accurate and efficient solution of multiscale modeling problems. The primary areas of mathematical and algorithmic development include:

Analytical modeling
Center manifold and slow manifold theory
Continuum modeling
Discrete modeling
Network-based modeling
Statistical modeling

See also
 Computational mechanics
 Equation-free modeling
 Integrated computational materials engineering
 Multiphysics
 Multiresolution analysis
 Space mapping

References

Further reading

External links

 Mississippi State University ICME Cyberinfrastructure
 Multiscale Modeling of Flow Flow
 Multiscale Modeling of Materials (MMM-Tools) Project at Dr. Martin Steinhauser's group at the Fraunhofer-Institute for High-Speed Dynamics, Ernst-Mach-Institut, EMI, at Freiburg, Germany. Since 2013, M.O. Steinhauser is associated at the University of Basel, Switzerland.
 Multiscale Modeling Group: Institute of Physical & Theoretical Chemistry, University of Regensburg, Regensburg, Germany
 Multiscale Materials Modeling: Fourth International Conference, Tallahassee, FL, USA
 Multiscale Modeling Tools for Protein Structure Prediction and Protein Folding Simulations, Warsaw, Poland
 Multiscale modeling for  Materials Engineering: Set-up of quantitative micromechanical models
 Multiscale Material Modelling on High Performance Computer Architectures, MMM@HPC project
 Modeling Materials: Continuum, Atomistic and Multiscale Techniques (E. B. Tadmor and R. E. Miller, Cambridge University Press, 2011)
 An Introduction to Computational Multiphysics II: Theoretical Background Part I Harvard University video series
 SIAM Journal of Multiscale Modeling and Simulation
 International Journal for Multiscale Computational Engineering
 Department of Energy Summer School on Multiscale Mathematics and High Performance Computing
 Multiscale Conceptual Model Figures for Biological and Environmental Science

Computational physics
Mathematical modeling